Same-sex marriage between citizens became legal in Taiwan on 24 May 2019, making Taiwan the first state in Asia to legalize same-sex marriage. Marriages between Taiwanese and foreign citizens were initially restricted to citizens of countries that also recognized same-sex marriage. That limitation was rescinded on 19 January 2023. The one remaining exception is citizens of mainland China, because cross-straits marriages must be registered in mainland China before they can apply in Taiwan.
Taiwanese same-sex marriage legislation does not cover joint adoption if the child is not genetically related to the couple, though one instance was approved by a local court in 2022.

Partnership registration

Same-sex couples are able to legally register their relationship through special "partnership registrations" in 18 of Taiwan's cities and counties that account for 94 percent of the country's population. However, the rights afforded in these partnerships are very limited; there are as many as 498 exclusive rights related to marriage that include property rights, social welfare and medical care. A special certificate is issued to the couple, providing the partners with some limited rights, notably the ability to consent to surgery for a partner and parental leave. Requirements vary by local government, with some requiring both partners to be residents of the city or county.

In May 2015, the special municipality of Kaohsiung announced a plan to allow same-sex couples to mark their partners in civil documents for reference purposes, although it would not be applicable to the healthcare sector. This policy of "partnership registrations" went into force on May 20. Taiwan LGBT Rights Advocacy, an NGO, criticized the plan as merely a measure to "make fun of" the community without having any substantive effect. In June 2015, Taipei became the second special municipality in Taiwan to open registration for same-sex couples, followed by Taichung on 1 October 2015.

In December 2015, the city governments of Taipei and Kaohsiung announced an agreement to share their same-sex partnership registries with each other, effective from 1 January 2016, allowing for partnerships registered in one special municipality to be recognized in the other. This marked the first time that same-sex partnerships had been recognized outside of single-municipality boundaries.

Activists protested on 18 December 2015 inside the Tainan City Council to lobby for a similar registry in Tainan. On 27 January 2016, Mayor Lai Ching-te announced that same-sex couples would be allowed to officially register their partnership in the city, starting on 1 February 2016.

New Taipei opened registration for same-sex couples on 1 February 2016. On 23 February 2016, Mayor Twu Shiing-jer announced that Chiayi City would be following suit on 1 March 2016. Chiayi City became the first of the three provincial cities of Taiwan to recognize same-sex couples. On 28 January 2016, the Mayor of Taoyuan, Cheng Wen-tsan, said that he is open to the possibility of a registry. On 7 March 2016, Tang Hui-chen, director of the Department of Civil Affairs at the Taoyuan City Government, said that based on "gender equality, basic human rights and respect for same-sex relationships", the government had decided to allow same-sex couples to register as partners. The registration began on 14 March 2016, making Taoyuan the sixth as well as the last special municipality in Taiwan to officially recognize same-sex couples.

On 18 March 2016, the Department of Civil Affairs at the Changhua County Government declared that based on respect and tolerance for same-sex couples, Changhua County had decided to open registration for same-sex couples. Couples who wish to register must be at least twenty years old and at least one partner must be resident in the county. The first couple registered the day the registration came into effect, on 1 April 2016. Hsinchu County also established a partnership registration that day, followed by Yilan County on 20 May 2016, and Chiayi County on 20 October 2016.

On 26 May 2017, the Ministry of the Interior formally asked all local governments to open registration for same-sex couples. By 6 June, Hsinchu City, Kinmen County, Lienchiang County, Miaoli County, Nantou County and Pingtung County had announced their intention to comply, with household registration services to open later that month or early July. Keelung City followed suit on 3 July 2017, and by the next day three same-sex couples had registered in the city.

On 3 July 2017, the Ministry of the Interior upgraded the nationwide household registration system to incorporate information about same-sex partnership registration into personal profiles.

Hualien County, Penghu County, Taitung County and Yunlin County did not open registration for same-sex couples. In September 2017, activists protested in Hualien and Taitung counties for the opening of registration services for same-sex couples.

Since the legalization of same-sex marriage in Taiwan on May 24, 2019, partnership registration is no longer available to Taiwanese couples and couples consisting of a Taiwanese national and a citizen of a country or territory where same-sex marriage is legal. Couples who have registered can choose to retain their partnership status or convert their union into a marriage. On May 25, 2020, the National Immigration Agency opened same-sex partnership registration to foreign couples.

Deputy Minister of the Interior Chen Chwen-jing announced in May 2020 that the Ministry of the Interior is likely to abolish the partnership registration system in the near future, noting that many couples had converted their partnership into a marriage by that time and that the system effectively served no purpose anymore. Chen announced that the Ministry would wait until more couples had converted their relationship into a marriage before taking a formal decision.

Same-sex marriage

Early history
In 2003, the Executive Yuan proposed legislation granting marriages to same-sex couples, but the bill was rejected in 2006 and was not passed into law because of majority opposition from legislators, which included both members of the Democratic Progressive Party (DPP) and the Kuomintang (KMT).

In August 2012, two women participated in what the media called Taiwan's first same-sex marriage ceremony. Around the same time, President Ma Ying-jeou, chairman of the governing Kuomintang, restated his respect for LGBT rights but said that public support was needed before the government could approve a same-sex marriage law. The Ministry of Justice's Department of Legal Affairs commissioned a study on legal recognitions of same-sex unions in Canada, Germany and France in 2012, but after pressure from critics, commissioned a further study for 2013 on the state of same-sex relationships in Asian countries for comparison.

In 2012, Su Tseng-chang, chairman of the Democratic Progressive Party, expressed support for same-sex marriage. Despite some division within the party on the issue, DPP's victorious presidential candidate for the January 2016 election, Tsai Ing-wen, announced her support of same-sex marriage in November 2015. She is the first major party candidate to come out in support of same-sex marriage.

In March 2012, a same-sex couple, Ching-Hsueh Chen and Chih-Wei Kao, applied to the Taipei High Administrative Court to have their relationship recognized as a marriage. The first hearing took place on April 10, 2012. The couple was accompanied by their mothers and received the personal blessings from the judges for their love, although the judges said that would not have any repercussions in their final ruling. The next hearing was set to take place a month later, and the court was due to hand down a decision on December 20. Instead, the court reneged on a ruling, opting to send the case to the Council of Grand Justices in the Judicial Yuan for a constitutional interpretation. The case was then voluntarily withdrawn by the couple due to the hesitancy of the judiciary in taking on the case.

On 25 October 2013, a petition-initiated bill to revise the Civil Code to allow for same-sex couples to marry was introduced by 23 lawmakers from the DPP to the Legislative Yuan. It was immediately referred to the Yuan's Judiciary, Organic Laws and Statutes Committee for review and a possible first reading. On 22 December 2014, the proposed amendment to the Civil Code was due to go under review by the committee. If the amendment had passed the committee stage, it would have then been voted on at the plenary session of the Legislative Yuan in 2015. The amendment, called the marriage equality amendment, would have inserted gender-neutral terms in the Civil Code replacing ones that implied heterosexual couples. It would have also allowed same-sex couples to adopt children. DPP member Yu Mei-nu expressed support for the amendment as did more than 20 other DPP lawmakers as well as two legislators from the Taiwan Solidarity Union and one each from the KMT and the People First Party.

On 28 June 2015, a senior official from the Ministry of Justice stated that same-sex marriage would remain illegal in Taiwan "for now". Deputy Minister of Justice Chen Ming-tang said "...in Taiwan, the issue of legalizing same-sex marriage remains extremely controversial...so we should not consider it for now". He added that while the Ministry of Justice opposed measures that would legalize same-sex marriages outright, it would support a more gradual approach, including offering better protection to same-sex couples under current laws, such as their rights to equal medical treatment and taxation.

In October 2015, same-sex couples were allowed to participate at the Taoyuan City Government's public mass wedding ceremony for the first time. Taipei followed suit one day later. On 28 October 2015, the Taichung City Government announced that same-sex couples would be permitted to participate in the following year's mass wedding ceremony.

2016 new administration and parliament
The Taiwanese elections held in January 2016 resulted in a victory for the Democratic Progressive Party (DPP). The DPP candidate, Tsai Ing-wen, won the presidential election, and the party won a parliamentary majority in the legislative election. The DPP is socially liberal and a majority of its members support the legalisation of same-sex marriage.

On 23 February 2016, the  rejected a proposal put forward by the Faith and Hope League on the grounds that it failed to meet requirements. The proposal would have amended the Civil Code by stating that husband and wife relationships, consanguinity and the principles of human relations cannot be amended unless the public agrees via a referendum. Had it been approved, the legalization of same-sex marriage would have only been possible through a referendum. The committee voted 10–1 against the proposal. Chairman of the committee, Wang Kao-cheng, said it was rejected for two reasons: one, that the proposed was not a law, a legislative principle, important policy or constitutional amendment and therefore does not meet the requirements of the Referendum Act; and two, the proposal was about revising several provisions of the Civil Code, which does not meet the law's requirement that a referendum should be about a single issue.

In July 2016, several Taiwanese legislators announced that they would introduce a same-sex marriage bill in Parliament by the end of 2016. On 25 October 2016, about a dozen legislators submitted a bill to legalize same-sex marriage in Taiwan. The proposed amendment was mostly supported by DPP legislators (whose party has a majority in the Legislative Yuan) though also by one legislator from the minority KMT, which was divided on the issue of same-sex marriage. Yu Mei-nu, who drafted the bill, expressed optimism the law could be introduced as early as the following year and that same-sex marriage could be legal in the country by the end of 2017. In addition, a separate amendment legalizing same-sex marriage was also announced by the third-party New Power Party (NPP) caucus. On 29 October, President Tsai Ing-wen reaffirmed her support for same-sex marriage. On 31 October 2016, the Secretary-General of the Executive Yuan, Chen Mei-ling, stated that the Executive supports same-sex marriage and that Premier Lin Chuan had urged the Ministry of Justice to take action on the issue. Two draft amendments to Taiwan's Civil Code to legalize both same-sex marriage and adoption by same-sex partners passed their first reading in the Legislative Yuan on 8 November 2016. Both bills were immediately referred to the Judiciary, Organic Laws and Statutes Committee for discussion.

The committee discussed the proposals on 17 November 2016 and was sharply divided. KMT and People First Party (PFP) representatives demanded a nationwide series of hearings be held over a number of months on the issue, while DPP legislators wanted the bills to be reviewed and immediately proceeded with. Following a number of physical scuffles between the MPs, the committee eventually agreed to hold two public hearings on the issue over the following two weeks; one hearing chaired by a KMT representative and another hearing chaired by a DPP representative. Several thousand opponents and supporters of same-sex marriage protested outside the Parliament on the streets of Taipei whilst the committee was meeting.

In early December 2016, tens of thousands of opponents of same-sex marriage demonstrated in the cities of Taipei, Taichung and Kaohsiung. Less than a week later, close to 250,000 supporters of same-sex marriage gathered in front of the Presidential Office in Taipei, calling on the Taiwan Government to promptly legalize same-sex marriage.

On 26 December 2016, the Judiciary, Organic Laws and Statutes Committee completed and passed its examination of the same-sex marriage bills. The bills then had to pass second and third reading in the Legislative Yuan before becoming law. In October 2017, Premier Lai Ching-te said that the government "is not giving up its effort to present a proposal before the end of the year to legalize same-sex marriage". Eventually however, the bills stalled and were not voted on.

2017 Constitutional Court ruling

In March 2017, the full panel of the Constitutional Court (Judicial Yuan) heard a case brought by gay rights activist Chi Chia-wei (whose attempt at registering a marriage with his partner in 2013 was rejected) and the Taipei City Government's Department of Civil Affairs. Taipei City, a special municipality, had originally referred the question of constitutionality to the court for resolution in July 2015. Both requested a constitutional interpretation on the issue and asked the court to focus on whether Taiwan's Civil Code allows same-sex marriage and if not, whether that violates articles of the Constitution of the Republic of China pertaining to equality and the freedom to marry.

The court issued its ruling (Judicial Yuan Interpretation No. 748) on 24 May 2017, finding that the statutory ban on same-sex marriage in the Civil Code was "in violation of both the people's freedom of marriage as protected by Article 22 and the people's right to equality as guaranteed by Article 7 of the Constitution." Thus, the provisions defining marriage as between one man and one woman are unconstitutional, and the court requested that the Legislative Yuan amend existing laws or create new laws that are compliant with its ruling. A time frame of two years was permitted for this to occur (i.e. by 24 May 2019), after which "two persons of the same-sex ... may apply for marriage registration [and] shall be accorded the status of a legally recognized couple, and then enjoy the rights and bear the obligations arising on couples", according to the official press release that accompanied the verdict.

As a result of the ruling, the Legislative Yuan could simply amend the existing marriage laws to include same-sex couples, thereby granting them the same rights enjoyed by married opposite-sex couples, or it could elect to pass a new law recognizing same-sex marriages or civil partnerships but giving said couples only some of the rights attributed to marriage.

In response to the ruling, Cabinet spokesman Hsu Kuo-yung said that the Executive Yuan would draft a proposal for revising the laws, though had not yet decided whether to amend the Civil Code to include same-sex couples in the definition of marriage or create a separate and distinct law specifically addressing same-sex marriages. The Secretary-General to the President, Joseph Wu, expressed his support for the ruling, claiming that it was "binding on all Taiwanese nationals and all levels of government".

By June 2017, the Executive Yuan had requested that government agencies relax restrictions on same-sex couples, to entitle them to rights accorded to married couples, such as signing medical consent forms, asking for family care leave and visiting imprisoned partners. The Secretary-General of the Executive, Chen Mei-ling, stated that the Cabinet had not yet decided on how to legalize same-sex marriages — by amending the Civil Code, by establishing a special section of the Civil Code or by creating a special law. Government inaction over the following months resulted in implementation of the court's ruling being pushed back.

In response to the ruling, 22 members of the Yunlin County Council voted to support a motion to impeach Hsu Tzong-li, the President of the Judicial Yuan, and the other judges who ruled in favor of same-sex marriage. The Deputy Speaker, who signed the motion, claimed that "marriages between same-sex couples will have a huge impact on the society and social order" and that the ruling had caused "disappointment and concern".

In December 2017, the Taipei Administrative Court ruled that same-sex couples could not marry in Taiwan until legislation is passed by the Legislative Yuan or until 24 May 2019 when the Constitutional Court ruling would go into effect.

In January 2018, opponents of same-sex marriage filed an appeal with the Supreme Administrative Court, seeking to annul the May 2017 decision. The appeal was quickly rejected by the court. They filed a second appeal in February, which was also unsuccessful.

2018 referendums

In February 2018, a group opposed to same-sex marriage, the Alliance for Next Generation's Happiness, proposed holding a referendum on the issue of same-sex marriage, which required collecting about 280,000 signatures (1.5% of eligible voters) for the initiative to be presented to the voters. Firstly, however, the group had to collect 1,879 valid signatures. This would then enable them to proceed with collecting the 280,000 signatures. By April 2018, the group had collected 3,100 signatures, and the Central Election Commission (CEC) validated the signatures later that month.

The group wanted the three following questions to be presented to Taiwanese voters:
"Do you agree with using means other than the marriage regulations in the Civil Code to protect the rights of two people of the same gender to build a permanent life together?"
"Do you agree that the marriage regulations in the Civil Code should define marriage as between a man and a woman?"
"Do you agree that during the elementary and junior high school stage, the Ministry of Education and schools at all levels should not implement same-sex education as stipulated in the Gender Equity Education Act's implementation rules?"

LGBT activist Chi Chia-wei described the referendum proposal as "clearly a violation of the Constitution".

In late August 2018, the Alliance for Next Generation's Happiness announced it had collected 678,000 signatures, which were then vetted and approved by the CEC. In September, a pro-same-sex marriage group announced it had collected more than 600,000 signatures to submit its own questions to a referendum, which were the following:

"Do you agree that the Civil Code marriage regulations should be used to guarantee the rights of same sex couples to get married?"
"Do you agree that gender equity education as defined in 'the Gender Equity Education Act' should be taught at all stages of the national curriculum and that such education should cover courses on emotional education, sex education and gay and lesbian education?"

The referendum proposals were also approved by the CEC, and a public vote was held on 24 November 2018. On 24 November, Taiwanese voters approved the three initiatives launched by the Alliance for Next Generation's Happiness and rejected the two pro-LGBT initiatives, by wide margins. The week before the vote, the government announced that the Constitutional Court ruling would still go into effect in May 2019 regardless of the referendum results. On 25 November 2018, the Executive Yuan's spokeswoman, Kolas Yotaka, stated that a draft of a special law to regulate same-sex marriages would be submitted to the Legislative Yuan within three months. On 29 November, the Judicial Yuan Secretary-General stated that the referendum results could not override the 2017 court ruling. The following day, Premier Lai Ching-te confirmed that the Taiwan Government respects the results of the referendum and would not amend the Civil Code, but rather prepare a special law on the matter, and on 5 December, the Minister of Justice, Tsai Ching-hsiang, said that a bill would be introduced before 1 March 2019.

Legislative process

On 20 February 2019, the Executive Yuan published a draft bill, entitled Act for Implementation of J.Y. Interpretation No. 748, which allows two persons of the same sex to create a "permanent union of intimate and exclusive nature for the committed purpose of managing a life together to fulfill the equal protection of the freedom of marriage". It covers topics such as inheritance rights, medical rights, and adoption of the biological children of the partner. The draft bill also sets penalties for adultery and bigamy, similar to opposite-sex marriages. The bill does not amend the existing marriage laws in the Civil Code, but rather creates a separate law. The bill was approved by the Executive Yuan on 21 February 2019 and then sent to the Legislative Yuan for passage, before taking effect on 24 May. It was well received by LGBT groups, but denounced by conservative organizations. NPP legislator Freddy Lim presented his own bill to legalize same-sex marriage on 21 February.

The Ministry of Justice has stated that the draft bill would be subject to further amendments, including on issues such as transnational marriages and assisted reproduction. Another difference between same-sex and opposite-sex marriages would be the minimum required age. Currently, women can marry at 16 and men at 18. Under the proposed law, same-sex couples would be able to get married from the age of 18, but would require parental consent if under 20.

On 5 March, the bill was moved to the second reading in a 59–24 vote.

On 14 March, the Legislative Yuan voted to send a draft bill that would limit the use of the words "marriage" and "spouse" to heterosexual couples to a second reading, where the bill would be reviewed together with same-sex marriage bill. The bill, entitled The Enforcement Act of Referendum No. 12, was proposed by KMT legislator Lai Shyh-bao. The bill was originally drafted by anti-LGBT campaigners and offered very limited rights. It would have allowed two adults of the same sex to register as one family, but limited how much one partner could inherit from another. The NPP attempted to block the bill, but failed to secure enough votes. Same-sex families and rights groups in Taiwan protested outside the Legislative Yuan and urged Lai to withdraw the "homophobic" draft bill.

Approval by the Legislative Yuan
On May 17, 2019, the DPP-controlled Legislative Yuan approved the same-sex marriage bill in its third and final reading. Over 40,000 people attended a rally organized by LGBT human rights organizations in front of the Legislative Yuan building to celebrate the bill's passage. The KMT caucus opposed the bill but allowed a free vote; subsequently, seven KMT legislators broke with their caucus to vote in favor. Articles 1-4 of the bill, submitted by the Executive Yuan and approved by the Legislative Yuan, allow same-sex couples to form an "exclusive permanent union" and apply for a "marriage registration" with government agencies, and refers to the Judicial Yuan ruling to enforce its definition of marriage. Other articles in the bill also specify that a married same-sex partner can adopt the biological child of their spouse. All 27 articles of the bill were approved, mostly by the DPP and NPP caucuses. The bill was signed into law by President Tsai Ing-wen on 22 May, and took effect on 24 May 2019.

According to the existing Act Governing the Choice of Law in Civil Matters Involving Foreign Elements, Taiwanese citizens can only marry foreign same-sex spouses who are citizens of countries or territories where same-sex marriage is legal. On 4 March 2021, the Taipei High Administrative Court ruled that these restrictions contravene the May 2017 Constitutional Court ruling. The government is currently drafting a bill to allow same-sex marriages between a Taiwanese national and a foreign citizen regardless of whether the spouse's homeland recognizes the union. While the changes will also cover Hong Kong and Macau, they will not apply to Chinese citizens.

Marriage certificates are issued by the Department of Household Registration Affairs. The spouse's name will appear on the person's national identification card (if the person is a Taiwanese national) or the resident certificate (if a permanent resident). Marriage certificates for same-sex couples share the same format as for opposite-sex couples.

Two other bills were submitted by conservative lawmakers (from both the KMT and the DPP), which sought to refer to the partnerships as "same-sex family relationships" or "same-sex unions" rather than same-sex marriage. These bills were not put to a vote.

Statistics

Marriage

526 same-sex couples got married on 24 May 2019, the first day they were legally permitted to do so. 185 were male couples and 341 were lesbian couples. New Taipei City registered the most marriages, with 117, following by Taipei with 95 and Kaohsiung with 72.

By 23 June 2019, 1,173 same-sex couples had married in Taiwan. 383 of them were male couples and 790 female couples. Two divorces took place. New Taipei City registered 242 same-sex marriages, followed by Taipei (198), Kaohsiung (159), Taichung (141), Taoyuan (123), Tainan (89), Hsinchu County (28), Hualien County (27), Pingtung County (27), Hsinchu (25), Yilan County (20), Changhua County (19), Miaoli County (19), Keelung (15), Nantou County (13), Yunlin County (12), Chiayi County (9), Taitung County (6), Chiayi (3), Penghu County (3), Kinmen County (2) and none in Lienchiang County. The first same-sex marriage in Lienchiang took place in Nangan in March 2020.

By 23 May 2020, almost one year after legalization, 4,021 couples had wed in Taiwan. The data released by the Ministry of the Interior showed that the majority of the marriages were between female couples, at 2,773 (69%), while 1,248 were between male couples. While the majority of same-sex marriages were between Taiwanese nationals, the number of transnational couples, in which one spouse was a foreign national, was 189, or 5 percent of the total. Among these transnational marriages, 80 spouses were from the United States, followed by Canada at 21 and Australia at 17.

On October 30, 2020, at the Ministry of National Defense's annual mass wedding ceremony, 2 same-sex couples were among the 188 couples who participated. Both were military officers marrying their civilian partner.

Partnerships 
By April 2016, more than 500 same-sex couples had registered their partnerships in the country, mostly in Taipei.

According to statistics published by the Ministry of the Interior, 272 same-sex partnerships were registered at the end of 2015, followed by 1,689 at the end of 2016, 2,142 by 31 May 2017, 2,890 by the end of 2017, 3,951 in November 2018, and 3,989 in late April 2019. In May 2020, there were 2,587 active same-sex partnership registrations, with many couples having converted their partnership into marriage.

Public opinion
A poll of 6,439 Taiwanese adults released in April 2006 by the National Union of Taiwan Women's Association/Constitutional Reform Alliance found that 75% believed same-sex relationships were acceptable, while 25% thought they were unacceptable.

A poll released in August 2013 showed that 53% of Taiwanese supported same-sex marriage, with 37% opposed. Among people aged between 20 and 29, support was at 78%. An important source of opposition was in the Taiwanese Christian community; only 25% of Christians supported same-sex marriage. Some Taiwanese Christian pastors have expressed support for the LGBT community, however. A November 2013 poll of 1,377 adults commissioned by cable news channel TVBS indicated that 45% of Taiwanese opposed same-sex unions, while 40% were in favor.

An opinion poll released in December 2014 showed that 54 percent of Taiwanese people supported the legalization of same-sex marriage, while 44.6 percent were opposed.

When conservative religious groups opposed to same-sex marriage launched a petition for public support of their position, a staff editorial from the English-language China Post questioned the logic of the opponents' arguments and endorsed the legalization of same-sex marriage as "a huge step forward in the fight for universal equality akin to ending apartheid". The Taipei Times also questioned the logic and arguments of the opposition.

An online opinion poll carried out by the Ministry of Justice between August and October 2015 indicated that 71% of the Taiwanese population supported same-sex marriage.

An opinion poll conducted in November 2016 by the Kuomintang party found that 52% of the Taiwanese population supported same-sex marriage, while 43% were opposed. Another poll commissioned that same month found similar numbers: 55% in support, and 45% in opposition. Support was highest among 20–29-year-olds (80%), but decreased significantly with age.

The 2018 Taiwanese referendum showed that 67.26% of Taiwanese people were against same-sex marriage (with 6,949,697 of 10,331,983 voters against).

An opinion poll conducted face-to-face in January–May 2020 by Taiwan's Election and Democratization Survey found that 43% of respondents supported same-sex marriage, while 57% were opposed.

According to a survey conducted in April–May 2020, 92.8% of Taiwanese thought that the legalization of same-sex marriage had had no personal impact on them, while 3.7% cited a negative impact, 1.8% a positive impact and 1.7% had no opinion on the matter. In terms of the impact on Taiwanese society, 50.1% said there had been no impact. In addition, 56.8% of respondents stated that they supported adoption by same-sex couples, while 38.4% were opposed. It was done by telephone interviews among Taiwanese people aged 18 and above and had 1,086 valid responses

A survey by the Department of Gender Equity of the Executive Yuan conducted in May 2021 showed that 60.4% of Taiwanese people supported same-sex marriage. 67.2% supported same-sex couples having the right to adopt children, and 72.2% believed gay couples can be as good parents as straight couples. It was done by telephone interviews among Taiwanese people aged 20 and above and had 1,080 valid responses

See also

 LGBT rights in Taiwan
 Recognition of same-sex unions in Asia

Notes

References

LGBT rights in Taiwan
Taiwan
2019 in LGBT history